European Universities Rugby 7s Championships were included in the EUSA Sports Program in 2007 and are organised annually since.

The European Universities Rugby 7s Championships are coordinated by the European University Sports Association along with the 18 other sports on the program of the European universities championships.

Overview

External links

References
 

rugby
Rugby sevens competitions in Europe
University and college rugby union competitions